Ernesto Almeida Soeiro (born 24 February 1961) is a Portuguese former professional footballer who played as a midfielder.

Club career 
Soeiro played at the youth level originally with Oeiras in 1975 then joined Estoril Praia the following season. In 1979, he joined the senior team and played in the Primeira Divisão. In total he appeared in eighty three matches and recorded one goal. In 1984, he played in the Segunda Divisão with Marítimo, and the following season he assisted in securing promotion to the Primeira Divisão. In 1986, he played abroad in the National Soccer League with Toronto First Portuguese.

International career 
Soeiro also represented the Portugal U21 national team and made three appearances.

References  

1961 births
Living people
People from Viseu
Portuguese footballers
Association football midfielders
Portugal youth international footballers
Portugal under-21 international footballers
G.D. Estoril Praia players
C.S. Marítimo players
Toronto First Portuguese players
Primeira Liga players
Segunda Divisão players
Canadian National Soccer League players
Portuguese expatriate footballers
Portuguese expatriate sportspeople in Canada
Expatriate soccer players in Canada
Sportspeople from Viseu District